Tete orthobunyavirus is a bunyavirus  found originally in Tete Province, Mozambique. It is a disease of animals and humans. Two forms, Bahig and Matruh viruses, were isolated from bird ticks including Hyalomma marginatum, but elsewhere mosquitoes and biting midges have been implicated as vectors.

Subtypes
Bahig  virus 
Matruh  virus
Tete virus SAAn3518
Tsuruse virus
Weldona virus

References

Literature 

Orthobunyaviruses